Kuttavum Shikshayum is a 2022 Indian Malayalam-language police drama film directed by Rajeev Ravi and written by Sibi Thomas and Sreejith Divakaran. The film stars Asif Ali, Sunny Wayne, Alencier Ley Lopez, Sharaf U Dheen, and Senthil Krishna. The film revolves around a mysterious robbery that took place in Kerala. It is produced by Arun Kumar V. R. under the banner of Film Roll Productions in association with Collective Studios.

Plot

The film is based on a jewellery robbery that occurred in Kasaragod in 2015. The case took a 5-member team from the Kerala Police force to a dreaded village in Rajasthan where they risked their lives to nab the culprits. Sibi Thomas was part of the investigation team that went to Rajasthan. Asif Ali plays the role of the real life Sibi Thomas in the film.

Ci Sajan Philip is suffering from PTSD because of a self-defense intended shooting gone wrong during a land strike. He starts investigating a jewelry break in case in his locality. The thieves had cut open the jewelry safe and made off with some gold. There are no visuals present at the area since the shop CCTVs are not working for some time now. Sajan gathers the team of SI Basheer, CPOs Rajesh Mathew, Abin Raj and SI Rajeevan. The team initially investigate around an ex-employee of the jewelry store Aravindan, who is suspected by the owner’s son since Aravindan was dismissed from service earlier for theft from the store. Upon investigating further however, the team finds out that he is innocent and earlier took some jewelry from store to help his lover’s family in debt, believing their words that it will be replaced quickly with money from a loan amount. He had to sell his own properly in the end to give back the ornaments to the owner and avoid aby legal action. From the CCTV visuals on the market the team finds out a commercial purpose van which has a plate not identified by the local taxi driver as a routine local vehicle. From Rajesh’s local contacts they trace the ownership of that vehicle to a loan shark Mookkan Balan. On arresting him, he tells them that he had leased out the vehicle to a north Indian migrant worker family, who were traveling clothes salesman using the vehicle for that purpose. 

Now almost certain that the robbery is done by the migrant laborer group, the team confirms their suspicions after secretly searching their rented house which had traces of the stolen jewelry boxes. Further, they find that the phone number of one of the gang members got from Mukkan is switched off from the day of robbery and found to be in the range of an UP-Rajasthan border village in between momentarily. The team sets out to north India to nab the culprits under the approval of SP Roopa. They are offered support by the local police station officials and get rooms booked in a shoddy place. After spending a day there, Sajan shifts himself and team at their own expense to the opposite much better place, but chooses not to vacate the initial lodge, not to create any ill feeling with the local cops. They learn that the thefts are done by locals belonging to a nearby village notorious for the thieving inhabitants who do not allow any police to enter their area and are a violent lot in defending their turf and kin. They scan the nearby areas with photographs of the accused (extracted from the photo IDs they had given in Kerala to get sim cards) and find out one of them as a local hooch suppliers aid. The team arrests them after posing as prospective buyers and plans to stakeout their village to nab the rest. However, he breaks out of Rajesh’s custody while he dozes off in the middle of his night watch. 

After a couple of unsuccessful attempts, the team finally nabs the gang members from the village at the night and escape from the womenfolk who come to attack them. While preparing to take them back to Kerala, the villagers block the first hotels entrance thinking that the team is staying there. Gaining some time due to this, Sajan, and team escape with the culprits from the opposite hotel when a passing vehicle blocks the villagers view and successfully comes back to Kerala. In the end its revealed that the gang members end up getting bail despite the daring operation carried out by the police team. The film ends with Sajan’s team chasing another gang of criminals for some other case.

Cast

Production
The story is about a real-life incident that happened in Kasargode. It was written by real-life cop and actor Sibi Thomas with journalist Sreejith Divakaran. Principal photography of the film was started on 7 February 2020. After taking a break due to the COVID-19 pandemic in India, the film resumed shooting in November 2020 and was completed in December in Rajasthan.

Release
It was anticipated to release around September 2020, but the release was postponed several times due to the COVID-19 pandemic. The film was released on 27 May 2022. The film started streaming on Netflix from 26 June 2022.

Reception

References

External links 
 

Films postponed due to the COVID-19 pandemic
2020s Malayalam-language films